Shapingba is a district of Chongqing, People's Republic of China, formerly known as Shaci District during the Sino-Japanese War. It is one of the central parts of Chongqing and covers around 396 square kilometers, with 13 subdistricts and 11 towns. Shapingba is one of the most populated areas in Chongqing with a population of around one million.

Location and Geography

Shapingba is one of Chongqing's main districts. It borders Jiulongpo to the south, Bishan to the west and Beibei to the north. The district itself is on the west bank of the Jialing River.

History
Before Shapingba District became a part of Chongqing, it was part of Baxian(Now Banan District). In the early 1930s, Shapingba District belonged to Baxian First District, the government was located at Ciqikou (Longyin Town) in the ancient section of town. During the period of the Second Sino-Japanese War, the Chiang Kai-shek’s government moved to Chongqing, and a large number of schools, factories and medical institutions settled in Shapingba.
On February 6, 1938, the Chongqing University, the Sichuan College of Education, the Chongqing Nankai Middle School, the Chongqing Electrical Steel Works and several institutions relocated to Shapingba from Beijing, Shanghai or Nanjing such as the National Central University, China Radio International, and the Academia Sinica.

Administrative divisions

Colleges and universities
Chongqing University (重庆大学) (founded in 1929)
Chongqing University of Science and Technology (重庆科技学院)
Army Medical University (陆军军医大学)
Chongqing Normal University (重庆师范大学)
Southwest University of Political Science and Law (西南政法大学)
Sichuan International Studies University (四川外国语大学)
Western Chongqing University (渝西学院)

Transport

Transport connections to and from Shapingba has improved over the years. There are buses that run directly to most other districts including Jiangbei, Yuzhong and Jiulongpo. Three highways, Chengdu-Chongqing, Chongqing-Changshou and Shangqiao-Jieshi come across here. Within only half an hour, it is possible to reach the Chongqing Jiangbei International Airport. Chongqing's West Railway Station is located in Shapingba. Though departures and arrivals are somewhat limited at this station, it is quite useful for trips to nearby destations such as Guiyang or Dazhou.
China National Highway 212

Metro
Shapingba is currently served by one metro lines operated by Chongqing Rail Transit:

 - Gaomiaocun, Majiayan, Xiaolongkan, Shapingba, Yanggongqiao, Lieshimu, Ciqikou, Shijingpo, Shuangbei, Laijiaqiao, Weidianyuan, Chenjiaqiao, Daxuecheng, Jiandingpo

Industry
The industry of Shapingba mainly consists of motorcycle and car manufacture, electrical equipment, biologic-chemical industry and tertiary occupation. The state owned corporations include Jialing Group, Southwest Pharmaceutical Co. Ltd and Chongqing Pesticide Chemical Group, while private owned corporations include Chongqing HuiLi Ltd , Lifan Group, Yuan Group and Huayang Group.

Tourism
Shapingba has a number of tourist attractions, including the monuments of Anti-Japanese War and Red Crag. The Geleshan is located in the old town of Ciqikou. Lin's Garden is also an attraction.

References

 
Districts of Chongqing